Podgorinsky is a rural locality (a khutor) in Rossoshinskoye Rural Settlement, Uryupinsky District, Volgograd Oblast, Russia. The population was 116 as of 2010. There are 5 streets.

Geography 
Podgorinsky is located in steppe, 36 km southwest of Uryupinsk (the district's administrative centre) by road. Bulekovsky is the nearest rural locality.

References 

Rural localities in Uryupinsky District